Actaea racemosa, the black cohosh, black bugbane, black snakeroot, rattle-top, or fairy candle (syn. Cimicifuga racemosa), is a species of flowering plant of the family Ranunculaceae. It is native to eastern North America from the extreme south of Ontario to central Georgia, and west to Missouri and Arkansas. It grows in a variety of woodland habitats, and is often found in small woodland openings. The roots and rhizomes were used in traditional medicine by Native Americans. Its extracts are manufactured as herbal medicines or dietary supplements. Most dietary supplements containing black cohosh are not well-studied or recommended for safe and effective use in treating menopause symptoms or any disease. In contrast, some herbal medicinal products containing black cohosh extract hold a marketing authorization in several states of the European Union are well-studied and recommended for safe and effective use for the relief of menopausal symptoms (i.e. in the years around menopause) such as hot flushes and profuse sweating attacks. Such differentiation between the product types seems to be important.

Taxonomy
The plant species has a history of taxonomic uncertainty. Carl Linnaeus, on the basis of morphological characteristics of the inflorescence and seeds, placed the species into the genus Actaea. This designation was later revised by Thomas Nuttall reclassifying the species to the genus Cimicifuga. Nuttall's classification was based solely on the dry follicles produced by black cohosh, which are typical of species in Cimicifuga. However, recent data from morphological and gene phylogeny analyses demonstrate that black cohosh is more closely related to species of the genus Actaea than to other Cimicifuga species. This has prompted the revision to Actaea racemosa as originally proposed by Linnaeus. Blue cohosh (Caulophyllum thalictroides), despite its similar common name belongs to another family, the Berberidaceae, is not closely related to black cohosh, and may be unsafe if used together.

Description

The flowers have a distinctly sweet, fetid smell that attracts flies, gnats, and beetles.

Cultivation
A. racemosa grows in dependably moist, fairly heavy soil. It bears tall tapering racemes of white midsummer flowers on wiry black-purple stems, whose mildly unpleasant, medicinal smell at close range gives it the common name "Bugbane". The drying seed heads stay handsome in the garden for many weeks. Its deeply cut, superficially maple-like leaves, burgundy colored in the variety "atropurpurea", add interest to gardens, wherever summer heat and drought do not make it die back, which make it a popular garden perennial. It has gained the Royal Horticultural Society's Award of Garden Merit.

The plant was Virginia Native Plant Society’s 2017 wildflower of the year.

Traditional medicine

History
Native Americans used black cohosh in the belief it could treat gynecological and other disorders. Following the arrival of European settlers in the U.S. who continued the use of black cohosh, the plant appeared in the U.S. Pharmacopoeia under the name "black snakeroot". In the 19th century, the root was used to treat snakebite, inflamed lungs, and pain from childbirth.

Herbalism
Extracts from the underground parts of the plant — the rhizome (Cimicifugae racemosae rhizoma) and the root (Cimicifugae racemosae radix) — are used in herbal medicine. The rhizomes and roots contain various saponins (triterpene saponins and triterpene glycosides, such as actein) as well as cimifugic acids and other phenol carboxylic acids.

In most European countries, China, Malaysia, Thailand, Argentina and some other countries, black cohosh products are available as herbal products which have been approved by regulatory authorities ensuring reliable pharmaceutical quality, safety and efficacy for the relief of menopausal complaints such as hot flushes and profuse sweating. In the U.S., India, and some other countries, black cohosh is used as a dietary supplement marketed mainly to women for treating menopausal symptoms and other gynecological problems. Meta-analyses of contemporary evidence support these claims on menopausal complaints only for products holding a marketing authorization for this indication, whereas there is no high-quality scientific evidence to support such uses for other products.

Safety concerns
The Herbal Medicinal Product Committee (HMPC) at the European Medicines Agency (EMA) has summarized the adverse drug reactions of herbal medicines made from cimicifuga with mentioning allergic skin reactions (urticaria, itching, exanthema), facial oedema and peripheral oedema, and gastrointestinal symptoms (i.e. dyspeptic disorders, diarrhoea).

Studies on the long-term safety of using herbal medicines made from black cohosh are available. They do not show harmful effects on breast tissue, endometrium, or breast cancer survivors. In contrast, such studies have not been published for dietary supplements made from black cohosh. Most black cohosh materials are harvested from the wild. Lack of proper authentication and adulteration of commercial preparations by other plant species are risk factors in dietary supplements and a critical matter of quality control in herbal medicinal products holding a marketing authorization. Very high doses of black cohosh may cause nausea, dizziness, visual effects, a lower heart rate, and increased perspiration.

Worldwide, some 83 cases of liver damage, including hepatitis, liver failure, and elevated liver enzymes, have been associated with using black cohosh, although a cause-and-effect relationship remains undefined. Millions of women have taken black cohosh without reporting adverse health effects, and a meta-analysis of clinical trials found no evidence that black cohosh preparations had adverse effects on liver function. Package leaflets of phytomedicines made from black cohosh caution that people with liver problems should not take it, although a 2011 meta-analysis of research evidence suggested this concern may be unfounded. In 2007, the Australian Government warned that black cohosh may cause liver damage, although rarely, and should not be used without medical supervision. Other studies concluded that liver damage from use of black cohosh is unlikely. The clinical picture is similar to an autoimmune hepatitis with centrilobular liver cell necrosis, which can be treated with corticosteroids.

Phytochemicals and pharmacology
The rhizomes and roots of black cohosh (Cimicifuga racemosa rhizoma) contain diverse phytochemicals, particularly various saponins (triterpene saponins/triterpene glycosides such as actein) as well as cimifugic acids and other phenol carboxylic acids. The pharmacologically active substance comprises the total extract. In the past, estrogen-like properties were attributed to preparations from this herbal drug. However, formonetin—a phytoestrogen compound (isoflavone)—could only be detected in methanolic extracts and was not found in ethanolic or isopropanolic cimicifuga extracts. Today, an estrogen-like mechanism of action can be ruled out. Regarding the alleviation of menopausal symptoms, central nervous activity was suspected as early as 2003, and it has since been confirmed with preclinical and clinical data.

See also
Caffeic acid
Ferulic acid
List of unproven and disproven cancer treatments
Phenylpropanoids
Triterpenoids

References

racemosa
Flora of North America
Plants used in traditional Native American medicine
Plants described in 1753
Taxa named by Carl Linnaeus